Manduca contracta is a moth of the  family Sphingidae. It is known from Bolivia, Argentina and is probably also present in Uruguay.

The wingspan is 95–105 mm.

Adults have been recorded in February, March, April, May, July, November and December.

References

Manduca
Moths described in 1875